René Cárdenas (born February 6, 1930) is a Nicaraguan sports journalist and announcer. He became the first Spanish-language announcer to cover Major League Baseball, when he joined the Los Angeles Dodgers in 1958. He has also broadcast games for the Houston Astros and Texas Rangers and has announced boxing matches as well. While working for the Astros, Cárdenas developed the first international radio network, which broadcast games to Central and South America.

Early life
Cárdenas was born in Managua, Nicaragua. He is the grandson of Adán Cárdenas, who introduced baseball to Nicaragua in the late 19th century and served as the President of Nicaragua. His uncle, Adolfo, played on the Nicaraguan national baseball team.

Career
At age 16, Cárdenas began writing about baseball for La Prensa and La Estrella de Nicaragua, Nicaraguan newspapers. He also called games on Radio Mundial.

In 1958, the Los Angeles Dodgers hired Cárdenas to announce their games on the radio in Spanish, making him the first Spanish-language baseball announcer in Major League Baseball. He trained Jaime Jarrín, who had little prior experience with baseball. Cárdenas also called a championship boxing match held between Sugar Ray Robinson and Gene Fullmer.

In 1961, he was hired by the expansion Houston Colt .45s (now the Houston Astros). He created the first international radio network for baseball in 1966 in order to help the Astros recruit talent in South and Central America. He also called events in other sports that were held at the Astrodome, including the boxing match won by Jimmy Ellis to claim the boxing championship stripped from Muhammad Ali. His signature was stamped onto the last beam used in its construction.

The Astros canceled their Spanish-language broadcasts in 1975, firing Cárdenas. He returned to Nicaragua, where he called games on television and radio, but he returned the United States in 1981 to call games for the Texas Rangers. From 1982 through 1998, he called games for the Dodgers. After that, he entered semi-retirement, as he continued to write for La Prensa and the Spanish-language website of the Astros.

Cárdenas returned to radio to broadcast Astros games in 2007. The following year, Cárdenas made his American television debut with the Astros, broadcasting 15 games.

Honors
In 2002, Cárdenas was inducted into the Hispanic Heritage Baseball Museum Hall of Fame. He was included in the balloting for the Ford C. Frick Award in 2011 and 2012, but did not win the award in either year.

Personal
Cárdenas' first marriage ended in divorce. He married his second wife, Jilma, in 1957. Cárdenas has a daughter from his first marriage and a son from his second.

Cárdenas became a citizen of the United States in 1963. In 1979, the couple fled Nicaragua and lost their home and valuables to the Sandinista National Liberation Front. Cárdenas' half-brother, Chester Escobar, had worked with the Somoza family, and was executed by the Sandinista government. Cárdenas now makes his home in Houston, and he refuses to return to Nicaragua until his belongings are returned to him.

Cárdenas is a survivor of colon cancer.

References

Major League Baseball broadcasters
Nicaraguan journalists
Los Angeles Dodgers announcers
Houston Astros announcers
Texas Rangers (baseball) announcers
Houston Astros executives
Boxing commentators
Living people
People from Managua
1930 births